Panriang County is an administrative area in Ruweng Administrative Area, South Sudan.

References

Ruweng Administrative Area
Counties of South Sudan